Erskine Leo Holt (February 8, 1915 – July 11, 2003) was Christian minister, missionary and religious leader who established many independent House Church communities throughout the United States. He was one of the founders of the Pan-American Mission and later founded Corvilla, a Christian retreat center in Zephyrhills, Florida.

Biography 

In his twenties, Holt graduated from college with a degree in chemistry and for a while taught that subject at the high school level. During the late depression and early years of World War II he sang to make his living as a nightclub entertainer.

Following a religious experience in 1943, Holt redirected his life towards the ministry, attending Central Bible Institute, an Assemblies of God Bible school in Springfield, Missouri. Following his graduation, he served in the Assemblies of God as a pastor and evangelist, both in the United States and in Africa. He was also designated the national soloist for the Assemblies of God with a daily radio program.

In 1947 the Latter Rain Revival, precursor to the Latter Rain Movement emerged in the Assemblies of God and Holt associated himself with that movement. When the movement was rejected by the leadership of the Assemblies of God, Holt and a number of other adherents were dismissed or resigned from the Assemblies of God. Holt, along with Donald W. Murphy, former missionary to India and Illinois District Superintendent for the Assemblies, joined Dr. Thomas Wyatt at the Wings of Healing Temple in Portland, Oregon. Holt also spent time at Bethesda Missionary Temple in Detroit, Michigan, the spiritual center of the Latter Rain Revival, founded by Myrtle Beall. It was there that Holt met and married Lucille Hamer. In 1950 Holt and his wife Lucille moved to Portland, Oregon where he was Dean of Bethesda Bible Institute till 1954 and also on staff at the Wings of Healing Temple. He also sang on the international Wings of Healing Radio Broadcast. In November 1953, Holt along with Max Wyatt, Paul Shaver and Paul Cannon met Dr. Thomas Wyatt and Raymond G. Hoekstra in Ibadon, Nigeria where they held huge meetings at the Race Track with many thousands attending. Great healings and miracles happened nightly. Completing those meetings they went to Accra, Gold Coast (Ghana) in meetings with healing and miracles happening there. After a week Dr. Wyatt and Hoekstra returned home. Holt and Max Wyatt remained for a month leaving the two younger men to continue the meetings all over Ghana and Nigeria. Upon leaving the Bible School, he founded Shiloh Temple in Muncie, Indiana.

He was a significant contributor to the Jesus movement of the 1970s. Presenting himself as part of the "establishment" he was also able to connect with the hippie youth culture of that era and organize their informal gatherings into ongoing house church congregations. As an older, mature Christian leader, he was able to provide some guidance to otherwise leaderless youth gatherings. Holt encouraged the development of house churches on college campuses. As the Jesus movement came to its quick end, many of the house churches he formed or nurtured moved into forming established churches, including Calvary Chapel.

After the demise of the Jesus movement, Holt continued to travel throughout the United States, and on occasion to other nations. He continued to visit "remnant" groups of Christians, such as those in house churches and informal Bible study gatherings that were not connected to any denomination or structure.

Holt was a follower of Charismatic Christianity and believed in traditional Pentecostal gifts, such as speaking in tongues. He strongly advocated a teaching known as five-fold ministry.

1915 births
2003 deaths
American Pentecostal pastors
Jesus movement